Anal eroticism, in psychoanalysis, is sensuous pleasure derived from anal sensations. Sigmund Freud, the founder of psychoanalysis, hypothesized that the anal stage of childhood psychosexual development was marked by the predominance of anal eroticism.

Sexological
The English sex manual The Joy of Sex talked about the erogenous sensitivity of the anus, and its role in sexual pleasure. Its author, Alex Comfort, stated that anal intercourse was part of many heterosexual as well as homosexual relationships (as indeed had Freud at the start of that century). Comfort also stressed the importance (in the French tradition) of postillionage or anal fingering prior to orgasm.

Developmental
In 1973, the psychoanalyst D. W. Winnicott spoke of "the tremendous pleasure that belongs to the doing of a motion just exactly when the impulse comes...another little orgy that enriches the life of the infant".

Freud, in his 1908 article Character and Anal Erotism argued that, through reaction formations and sublimation, anal eroticism could turn in later life into character traits such as obstinacy, orderliness and meanness. The psychoanalyst Sándor Ferenczi extended his findings in 1974 to cover the sublimation of anal eroticism into aesthetic experiences such as painting and sculpture, as well as into an interest in money. In 1946, the psychoanalyst Otto Fenichel linked anal eroticism to feelings of disgust, to masochism, and to pornography.

The psychoanalyst Julia Kristeva would subsequently explore anal eroticism in connection with her concept of abjection.

See also

References

Further reading
 Susan Isaacs, 'Penis-Feces-Child', International Journal of Psychoanalysis VIII (1927)
 Jack Morin, Anal Pleasure and Health: A Guide for Men, Women and Couples, 4th edition, San Francisco, Down There Press, 2010,

External links
 

 
Freudian psychology
Psychoanalytic terminology